is a Japanese footballer currently playing as a centre back for Vanraure Hachinohe on loan from Shonan Bellmare from 2023.

Club career
Minoda begin first youth career with Tsurumi East FC and Mamedo FC. Later, he entered to Aomori Yamada High School until 2017.

In 2018, Minoda enter Hosei University as University Team until he was graduation in 2021. On 24 February 2021, he announcement joined with Shonan Bellmare from 2022. On 4 March at same year, he was approved as Designated Player.

In 2022, Minoda begin first professional career with J1 club, Shonan Bellmare. On 23 February at same year, he debuted against Avispa Fukuoka in J. League Cup Matchweek 1 Group Stage.

On 7 June 2022, Shonan Bellmare has loaned Minoda to J3 club, SC Sagamihara for mid of 2022 season.

On 17 December 2022, Minoda has loaned again to J3 club, Vanraure Hachinohe for upcoming 2023 season.

Career statistics

Club
.

Notes

References

1999 births
Living people
People from Yokohama
Association football people from Kanagawa Prefecture
Hosei University alumni
Japanese footballers
Association football defenders
J1 League players
J3 League players
Shonan Bellmare players
SC Sagamihara players
Vanraure Hachinohe players